Allias is a neighbourhood of Tirana, Albania.  It is located west of the central boulevard.

References

Neighbourhoods of Tirana